The School of Leadership and Development (SLD) is part of Eastern University in St. Davids, Pennsylvania. The school delivers educational programs in the United States and internationally, often through partnerships with organizations like World Vision International and Habitat for Humanity International.

History
The Economic Development program was founded in 1984 by Tony Campolo, Lin Geiger, Robert Seiple and others. Subsequent programs to be developed included concentrations in International and Urban Economic Development. In 1999, the School of International Leadership and Development was established, along with the signing of a partnership with World Vision International to deliver a Master of Business Administration (MBA) in NGO Leadership. In 2003, Habitat for Humanity International joined the program, the degree offered was converted to an MA in Organizational Leadership, and the School removed 'International' from its name. From 2006, the school began offering an MA in International Development and various certificates in leadership and development.

Areas of study
Areas of study include economic development, international development, international studies, leadership, development studies, servant leadership, economics and others. SLD has also been involved in AIDS research and Sustainable Development.

External links
 Eastern University

Educational institutions established in 1984
Eastern University (United States)
1984 establishments in Pennsylvania